Gmeiner is a surname. Notable people with the surname include:

Fabian Gmeiner (born 1997), Austrian footballer
Hermann Gmeiner (1919–1986), Austrian philanthropist
Josef Anton Gmeiner (1862–1926), Austrian mathematician
Manfred Gmeiner (born 1941), German ice hockey player
, researcher